Mohammad-Reza (also spelled as Mohammad Reza, or Mohammadreza) is a popular male given name in Iran. Mohammad and Reza are both Arabic names which are popular in the whole Muslim world. However, the usage of the compound given name Mohammad-Reza is mostly popular in the modern Iran (mostly among those who are born after 1926, when Reza Shah was crowned and his son, Mohammad-Reza, became the crown prince).

People
 Mohammad-Reza Adelkhani
 Mohammad-Reza Amin
 Mohammad-Reza Aref
 Mohammad-Reza Bahonar
 Mohammad-Reza Bateni
 Mohammad Reza Eskandari
 Mohammad-Reza Foroutan
 Mohammad Reza Golzar
 Mohammad-Reza Golpaygani
 Mohammad-Reza Hafeznia
 Mohammad-Reza Hedayati
 Mohammad-Reza Heidarian
 Mohammad-Reza Honarmand
 Mohammad Reza Jozi
 Mohammad Reza Khalatbari (footballer, born 1948)
 Mohammad Reza Khalatbari (footballer, born 1983)
 Mohammad-Reza Khatami
 Mohammad-Reza Lotfi
 Mohammad-Reza Mahdavi
 Mohammad-Reza Mahdavi Kani
 Mohammad Reza Mamani
 Mohammad-Reza Modarresi Yazdi
 Mohammad Reza Pahlavi (also known as Mohammad Reza Shah), the second Shah of the Pahlavi Dynasty and the last Shah of Iran
 Mohammad Reza Rahimi
 Mohammad-Reza Roudaki
 Mohammad Reza Saket
 Mohammad-Reza Shafiei Kadkani
 Mohammad-Reza Shajarian
 Mohammad-Reza Sharifinia
 Mohammed Reza Taheri-azar
 Mohammad-Reza Tavassoli
 Mohammad-Reza Zahedi
 Mohammad-Reza Zarrindast

Iranian masculine given names